List of notable OAuth service providers.

See also 
 List of single sign-on implementations

Notes

References 

OAuth providers